USS Dionne (DE-261) was an  of the United States Navy during World War II. She was sent off into the Pacific Ocean to protect convoys and other ships from Japanese submarines and fighter aircraft. She performed escort and antisubmarine operations in dangerous battle areas and returned home with six battle stars, a high number for a ship of her type.

Namesake
Arthur Louis Dionne was born on 6 June 1915 in Walpole, Massachusetts. He enlisted in the United States Naval Reserve on 4 November 1941 and was appointed a Midshipman 9 February 1942. Ensign Dionne was killed aboard  during the Battle of Tassafaronga on 30 November 1942.

Construction and commissioning
Dionne was launched on 10 March 1943 by Boston Navy Yard; sponsored by Mrs. L. A. Dionne, mother of Ensign Dionne; and commissioned on 16 July 1943.

World War II Pacific Theatre operations 
Dionne sailed from Boston, Massachusetts, on 7 September 1943 to escort a convoy to Norfolk, Virginia. She conducted training in the Chesapeake Bay area until 2 October when she got underway for the Pacific Ocean. Arriving at Pearl Harbor on 26 October she was assigned to night radar picket duty and on 15 November she sortied for the invasion of the Gilbert Islands. Dionne screened a group of tankers serving the ships engaged in this operation until her return to Pearl Harbor on 12 January 1944 for repairs.
 
From 4 February to 1 March 1944 Dionne served in the Marshalls operation, escorting convoys and acting as harbor guard at Kwajalein. After an overhaul at Mare Island, California, from 9 March to 8 April she sailed to Kwajalein and Eniwetok as convoy escort, then returned to Pearl Harbor on 10 May to rehearse amphibious landings.

Invasion of the Marianas  
Dionne sailed from Pearl Harbor on 1 June 1944 for the invasion of the Marianas. She patrolled by day and screened transports at night, picking up seven Japanese prisoners and a 9-year-old Japanese girl. On 21 June she screened  during her bombardment of Saipan. From 25 June to 16 July she was at Eniwetok to replenish, returning to Guam for a pre-invasion bombardment on 20 and 21 July and to provide fire support for the landings of 21 July. Three days later she bombarded Tinian, off which she patrolled until returning to Pearl Harbor on 3 September.
 
On 23 September 1944 Dionne departed for Ulithi carrying garrison forces. She remained there from 8 to 24 October on patrol and local escort duty. Dionne served in anti-submarine warfare exercises and amphibious training in the Hawaiian Islands until 20 January 1945 when she began convoy duty between Pearl Harbor and Eniwetok.

Supporting Saipan and Iwo Jima operations 
Dionne sailed from Eniwetok on 21 February 1945 for Saipan and Iwo Jima, landing her garrison group there on 7 March. She patrolled off Iwo Jima until 20 March, then sailed for Pearl Harbor with evacuated combat troops, arriving on 4 April. Four days later she got underway for San Francisco, California, and overhaul.
 
Returning to Pearl Harbor on 15 June 1945 Dionne escorted convoys to Eniwetok and Ulithi. On 25 July she departed Ulithi to join the oilers serving the 3rd Fleet during their strikes on the Japanese mainland, duty which occupied her until the end of the war.

End-of-War activity 
From 4 September she screened oilers fueling ships of the 7th Fleet operating in the Yellow Sea and off Jinsen, Korea. Dionne sailed from Jinsen on 5 October for Pearl Harbor and the west coast, arriving at San Francisco on 25 November.

Post-War decommissioning 
She was decommissioned on 18 January 1946. Dionne was sold on 12 June 1947.

Awards  
Dionne received six battle stars for World War II service.

References

External links

 

Evarts-class destroyer escorts
World War II frigates and destroyer escorts of the United States
Ships built in Boston
1943 ships